Reginald Baker may refer to:

 Reginald Baker (film producer) (1896–1985), British film producer
 Reginald Tustin Baker (1900–1966), English organist and composer
 Snowy Baker (Reginald Leslie Baker, 1884–1953), Australian sportsman, sports promoter and actor
 Reg Baker (1899–1977), Australian rules footballer